Thiotricha celata is a moth of the family Gelechiidae. It was described by Mikhail Mikhailovich Omelko  in 1993. It is found in Korea, China (Jilin), Japan and the Russian Far East.

References

Moths described in 1993
Thiotricha